The 1932 Illinois gubernatorial election was held on November 8, 1932. It saw the election of Democrat Thomas Donavan, who defeated incumbent Republican liuetenant governor Fred E. Sterling.

Primary elections
Primary elections were held on April 12, 1932.

Democratic primary

Candidates
Thomas F. Donovan, Democratic nominee for Attorney General of Illinois in 1924
Jay J. McCarthy
Wallace G. McCauley
Thomas O'Connor
Neil J. O'Hanley

Withdrew
James A. McCallum

Results

Republican primary

Candidates
Edward C. Longfellow
Theodore D. Smith, unsuccessful candidate for Republican nomination for lieutenant governor in 1928
Fred E. Sterling, incumbent lieutenant governor
Guy M. Talcott	
James C. White
Abraham Lincoln Wisler, unsuccessful candidate for Republican nomination for U.S. Senate in 1930

Results

General election

Major candidates
Thomas F. Donovan, Democratic
Fred E. Sterling, Republican

Minor candidates
Arthur Herchy, Communist
Meyer Halushka, Socialist, high school teacher
Frank Schnur, Socialist Labor, nominee for Attorney General of Illinois in 1928

Results

See also
1932 Illinois gubernatorial election

References

Bibliography

1932
lieutenant gubernatorial
Illinois
November 1932 events in the United States